Phosphatidylinositol-3,4,5-trisphosphate 5-phosphatase (EC 3.1.3.86, SHIP, p150Ship) is an enzyme with systematic name 1-phosphatidyl-1D-myo-inositol-3,4,5-trisphosphate 5-phosphohydrolase, that has two isoforms: SHIP1 (produced by the gene INPP5D) and SHIP2 (INPPL1).  

This enzyme catalyses the following chemical reaction

 1-phosphatidyl-1D-myo-inositol 3,4,5-trisphosphate + H2O  1-phosphatidyl-1D-myo-inositol 3,4-bisphosphate + phosphate

This enzyme hydrolyses 1-phosphatidyl-1D-myo-inositol 3,4,5-trisphosphate (PtdIns(3,4,5)P3) to produce PtdIns(3,4)P2.

References

External links 
 

EC 3.1.3